The J. O. House and the J. O. Lee Honey House in Jerome, Idaho are lava rock structures built in 1929 and 1926.  They were separately listed on the National Register of Historic Places in 1983.

The house is located at 324 Fifth Avenue East.

The Honey House is at 322 Fifth Avenue East.

References

Houses on the National Register of Historic Places in Idaho
Houses completed in 1929
Jerome County, Idaho
Lava rock buildings and structures